Bani Khalid Emirate or the Emirate of Al Hamid from the Bani Khalid tribe was a state that arose in the eastern region of the Arabian Peninsula in year 1669 after Emir Barak bin Ghurair made his capital in Al-Mubarraz then managed to defeat the Ottoman Empire represented by Lahsa Eyalet and drove them out of the region. The Emirate of Al Hamid ended in the year 1796 after the defeat of Barak bin Abdul Mohsen at the hands of the First Saudi State.

History

First Khalidi Emirate
The main branches of the tribe are the Al Humaid, the Juboor, the Du'um, the Al Janah, the Al Suhoob, the Grusha, the Al Musallam, the 'Amayer, the Al Subaih and the Mahashir & Nahood. The chieftainship of the Bani Khalid has traditionally been held by the clan of Al Humaid. The Bani Khalid dominated the deserts surrounding the Al-Hasa and Al-Qatif during the 15th and 18th century. Under Barrak ibn Ghurayr of the Al Humaid, the Bani Khalid were able to expel Ottoman forces from the cities and towns in 1670 and proclaim their rule over the region. Ibn Ghurayr made his capital in Al-Mubarraz, where remnants of his castle stand today. According to Arabian folklore, one chief of the Bani Khalid attempted to protect the prized desert bustard (Habari) from extinction by prohibiting the bedouin in his realm from poaching the bird's eggs, earning the tribe the appellation of "protectors of the eggs of the Habari", an allusion to the chief's absolute supremacy over his realm. The first chieftain of the "Khawalid" was Haddori.

Fall to the Saudis
The Bani Khalid of eastern Arabia maintained ties with members of their tribe who had settled in Nejd during their earlier migration eastwards, and also cultivated clients among the rulers of the Najdi towns, such as the Al Mu'ammar of al-Uyayna. When the emir of Uyayna adopted the ideas of Muhammad ibn Abd al-Wahhab, the Khalidi chief ordered him to cease support for Ibn Abd al-Wahhab and expel him from his town. The emir agreed, and Ibn Abd al-Wahhab moved to neighboring Dir'iyyah, where he joined forces with the Al Saud. The Bani Khalid remained staunch enemies of the Saudis and their allies and attempted to invade Nejd and Diriyyah in an effort to stop Saudi expansion. The first attacks of the Al Saud occurred in 1763 which were led by Abdulaziz bin Muhammad. Their efforts failed, however, and after conquering Nejd, the Saudis invaded the Bani Khalid's domain in al-Hasa and deposed the Al 'Ura'yir in 1789.

Return and Fall from Power
When the Ottomans invaded Arabia and overthrew the Al Saud in 1818, they conquered al-Hasa, al-Qatif and reinstated members of the Al 'Uray'ir as rulers of the region. The Bani Khalid were no longer the potent military force they once were at this time, and tribes such as the Ajman, the Dawasir, and Subay' began encroaching on the Bani Khalid's desert territories. They were also beset by internal quarrels over leadership. Though the Bani Khalid were able to forge an alliance with the 'Anizzah tribe in this period, they were eventually defeated by an alliance of several tribes along with the Al Saud, who had reestablished their rule in Riyadh in 1823. A battle with an alliance led by the Mutayr and Ajman tribes in 1823, and another battle with the Subay' and the Al Saud in 1830, brought the rule of the Bani Khalid to a close. The Ottomans appointed a governor from Bani Khalid over al-Hasa once more in 1874, but his rule also was short-lived.

List of rulers

Emirs of Bani Khalid (1669–1796)

Notes

References
Anscombe, Frederick F., The Ottoman Gulf: the creation of Kuwait, Saudi Arabia, and Qater, 1870–1914, Columbia University Press, New York 1997
Fattah, Hala Mundhir. (1997). The Politics of Regional Trade in Iraq, Arabia, and the Gulf, 1745–1900, SUNY Press. 
Ibn Agil al-Zahiri, Ansab al-Usar al-Hakima fi al-Ahsa ("The Genealogies of the Ruling Families of al-Ahsa, Part II: Banu Humayd (Al 'Uray'ir)"), Dar al-Yamama, Riyadh, Saudi Arabia (Arabic)
أبو عبدالرحمن بن عقيل الظاهري، "أنساب الأسر الحاكمة في الأحساء، القسم الثاني: بنو حميد (آل عريعر)"، من منشورات دار اليمامة، الرياض، المملكة العربية السعودية

Al Jassir, Hamad, Jamharat Ansab al-Usar al-Mutahaddirah fi Nejd ("Compendium of the Geanologies of the Settled Families of Nejd"), entry on "Banu Khalid" (Arabic)
al-Juhany, Uwaidah, Najd Before the Salafi Reform Movement, Ithaca Press, 2002
Lorimer, John Gordon, Gazetteer of the Persian Gulf, Oman and Central Arabia, republished by Gregg International Publishers Limited Westemead.  Farnborough, Hants., England and Irish University Press, Shannon, Irelend.  Printed in Holland, 1970
Mandaville, Jon E., "The Ottoman Province of al-Hasā in the Sixteenth and Seventeenth Centuries", Journal of the American Oriental Society, Vol. 90, No. 3. (Jul. - Sep., 1970), pp. 486–513 

Oppenheim, Max Freiherr von, with Braunlich, Erich and Caskill, Werner, Die Beduinen, 4 volumes, Otto Harrassowitz Wiesbaden 1952 (German)
Szombathy, Zoltan, Genealogy in Medieval Muslim Societies, Studia Islamica, No. 95. (2002), pp. 5–35 
Al-Rasheed, Madawi, A History of Saudi Arabia, Cambridge University Press, 2002 (through GoogleBooks )
Rentz, George, "Notes on Oppenheim's 'Die Beduinen'", Oriens, Vol. 10, No. 1. (31 Jul. 1957), pp. 77–89 
Al-Wuhaby, Abd al-Karim al-Munif, Banu Khalid wa 'Alaqatuhum bi Najd ("Banu Khalid and their Relations with Nejd"), Dar Thaqif lil-Nashr wa-al-Ta'lif, 1989 (Arabic)
عبدالكريم الوهيبي، "بنو خالد وعلاقتهم بنجد"، دار ثقيف للنشر والتأليف، 1989 

Arabs from the Ottoman Empire
Tribes of Arabia
Ottoman Arabia
Arab dynasties
Arab slave owners